Munzinger-Archiv is an encyclopedia created by Ludwig Munzinger in 1913. Ludwig Munzinger Jr. took over Munzinger-Archiv in 1957.

References 

1913 establishments in Germany
German online encyclopedias
German-language encyclopedias
German biographical dictionaries